Viola perreniformis is a species of violet, native to eastern Australia. Growing in moist rocky situations, north of Sydney.

References

perreniformis
Flora of New South Wales
Flora of Queensland
Malpighiales of Australia